Frederick C. Orthwein (May 12, 1871 - September 23, 1927) was an American businessman from St. Louis, Missouri.

Early life
Orthwein was born on May 11, 1871, in St. Louis, where his father, William D. Orthwein, was a German-born grain merchant.

Career
Orthwein was the owner and president of the William D. Orthwein Grain Company, founded by his father. In 1900, he co-founded the Gulf Ports Grain Exporters' Association, a trade organization whose aim was to set common rules of grain exports among merchants in St. Louis, Chicago and Kansas City, Missouri. Orthwein served as its secretary and treasurer.

Orthwein also served as the president of the William F. Niedringhaus Investment Company, his father-in-law's investment firm. Like his father, he served on the boards of directors of the Mississippi Valley Trust Company and the Kinloch Telephone Company. He also served on the boards of the St. Louis Coke & Chemical Company, the Gilbsonite Construction Company, and Anheuser-Busch. From 1913 to 1915, Orthwein served on the board of the National Bank of Commerce of St. Louis.

Personal life
In 1896, Orthwein married Jeannette F. Niedringhaus, the daughter of William F. Niedringhaus and niece of Frederick G. Niedringhaus. They had three sons—William D. Orthwein II, Frederick C. Orthwein Jr., and Richard Walter Orthwein—and one daughter, Janet. They were members of the Methodist Episcopal Church.

Orthwein was a member of the St. Louis Club, the Racquet Club of St. Louis, the Sunset Hill Country Club, and the Bellerive Country Club. He was an avid golf player.

Death
Orthwein died in 1927. He was buried at the Bellefontaine Cemetery in St. Louis.

References

1871 births
Businesspeople from St. Louis
American corporate directors
American people of German descent
Burials at Bellefontaine Cemetery
1927 deaths
Orthwein business family